In linguistics, irrealis moods (abbreviated ) are the main set of grammatical moods that indicate that a certain situation or action is not known to have happened at the moment the speaker is talking. This contrasts with the realis moods.

Every language has grammatical ways of expressing unreality. Linguists tend to reserve the term "irrealis" for particular morphological markers or clause types. Many languages with irrealis mood make further subdivisions between kinds of irrealis moods. This is especially so among Algonquian languages such as Blackfoot.

List of irrealis moods

Moods

Subjunctive 

The subjunctive mood, sometimes called conjunctive mood, has several uses in dependent clauses.  Examples include discussing hypothetical or unlikely events, expressing opinions or emotions, or making polite requests (the exact scope is language-specific). A subjunctive mood exists in English, but it often is not obligatory.  Example: "I suggested that Paul eat an apple", Paul is not in fact eating an apple.  Contrast this with the sentence "Paul eats an apple", where the verb "to eat" is in the present tense, indicative mood.  Another way, especially in British English, of expressing this might be "I suggested that Paul should eat an apple", derived from "Paul should eat an apple."

Other uses of the subjunctive in English, as in "And if he be not able to bring a lamb, then he shall bring for his trespass..." (KJV Leviticus 5:7), have become archaic or formal.  Statements such as "I shall ensure that he leave immediately" often sound [overly] formal, and often have been supplanted by constructions with the indicative, such as "I'll make sure [that] he leaves immediately". (In other situations, the verb form for subjunctive and indicative may be identical: "I'll make sure [that] you leave immediately.)

The subjunctive mood figures prominently in the grammar of the Romance languages, which require this mood for certain types of dependent clauses. This point commonly causes difficulty for English speakers learning these languages.

In certain other languages, the dubitative or the conditional moods may be employed instead of the subjunctive in referring to doubtful or unlikely events (see the main article).

Conditional 

The conditional mood (abbreviated ) is used to speak of an event whose realization is dependent upon another condition, particularly, but not exclusively, in conditional sentences. In Modern English, it is a periphrastic construction, with the form would + infinitive, e.g., I would buy. In other languages, such as Spanish or French, verbs have a specific conditional inflection. Thus, the conditional version of "John eats if he is hungry" is:

 English: John would eat if he were hungry
 
 or: 
 
 
 
 
 
 
 Norwegian 
 Norwegian 
 
 
 
 

In the Romance languages, the conditional form is used primarily in the apodosis (main clause) of conditional clauses, and in a few set phrases where it expresses courtesy or doubt. The main verb in the protasis (dependent clause) is either in the subjunctive or in the indicative mood. However, this is not a universal trait: among others in German (as above) and in Finnish the conditional mood is used in both the apodosis and the protasis.

A further example of Finnish conditional is the sentence "I would buy a house if I earned a lot of money", where in Finnish both clauses have the conditional marker : , just like in Hungarian, which uses the marker : . In Polish the conditional marker  also appears twice: . Because English is used as a lingua franca, a similar kind of doubling of the word would is a fairly common way to misuse an English language construction.

However, this usage is heavily stigmatized. In the literary language, past unreal conditional sentences as above may take the pluperfect subjunctive in one clause or both, so that the following sentences are all valid and have the same meaning as the preceding example: ; ; .

In English, too, the would + infinitive construct can be employed in main clauses, with a subjunctive sense: "If you would only tell me what is troubling you, I might be able to help".

Optative 

The optative mood expresses hopes, wishes or commands. Other uses may overlap with the subjunctive mood. Few languages have an optative as a distinct mood; some that do are Albanian, Ancient Greek, Sanskrit, Finnish, Avestan (it was also present in Proto-Indo-European, the ancestor of the aforementioned languages except for Finnish).

In Finnish, the mood may be called an "archaic" or "formal imperative", even if it has other uses; nevertheless, it at least expresses formality. Also, using the conditional mood  in conjunction with the clitic  yields an optative meaning:  "if only I were". Here, it is evident that the wish has not been fulfilled and probably will not be.

In Sanskrit, the optative is formed by adding the secondary endings to the verb stem. The optative, as other moods, is found in active voice and middle voice. Examples:  "may you bear" (active) and  "may you bear [for yourself]" (middle). The optative may not only express wishes, requests and commands, but also possibilities, e.g.,  "he might perhaps wake up due to the bellowing of cows", doubt and uncertainty, e.g.,  "how would I be able to recognize Nala?" The optative may further be used instead of a conditional mood.

Jussive 

The jussive mood (abbreviated ) expresses plea, insistence, imploring, self-encouragement, wish, desire, intent, command, purpose or consequence. In some languages, this is distinguished from the cohortative mood in that the cohortative occurs in the first person and the jussive in the second or third. The rules governing the jussive in Arabic are somewhat complex.

Potential 
The potential mood (abbreviated ) is a mood of probability indicating that, in the opinion of the speaker, the action or occurrence is considered likely. It is used in many languages, including in Finnish, Japanese, and Sanskrit (including its ancestor Proto-Indo-European), and in the Sami languages.  (In Japanese it is often called something like tentative, since potential is used to refer to a voice indicating capability to perform the action.)

In Finnish, it is mostly a literary device, as it has virtually disappeared from daily spoken language in most dialects. Some kinds of consonant clusters simplify to geminates.

Imperative 

The imperative mood expresses direct commands, requests, and prohibitions. In many circumstances, using the imperative mood may sound blunt or even rude, so it is often used with care. Example: "Paul, do your homework now".  An imperative is used to tell someone to do something without argument.

Many languages, including English, use the bare verb stem to form the imperative (such as "go", "run", "do").  Other languages, such as Seri and Latin, however, use special imperative forms.

In English, second person is implied by the imperative except when first-person plural is specified, as in "Let's go" ("Let us go").

The prohibitive mood, the negative imperative may be grammatically or morphologically different from the imperative mood in some languages. It indicates that the action of the verb is not permitted, e.g., "Do not go!" (archaically, "Go not!"). In Portuguese and Spanish, for example, the forms of the imperative are only used for the imperative itself, e.g., "" "" ("leave!"), whereas the subjunctive is used to form negative commands, e.g., "" "" ("don't leave!").

In English, the imperative is sometimes used to form a conditional sentence: e.g., "Go eastwards a mile, and you will see it" means "If you go eastward a mile, you will see it".

Desiderative 

Whereas the optative expresses hopes, the desiderative mood expresses wishes and desires. Desires are what we want to be the case; hope generally implies optimism toward the chances of a desire's fulfillment. If someone desires something but is pessimistic about its chances of occurring, then one desires it but does not hope for it. Few languages have a distinct desiderative mood; three that do are Sanskrit, Japanese, and Proto-Indo-European.

In Japanese the verb inflection  expresses the speaker's desire, e.g.,  "I want to go there". This form is treated as a pseudo-adjective: the auxiliary verb  is used by dropping the end  of an adjective to indicate the outward appearance of another's mental state, in this case the desire of a person other than the speaker (e.g.  "John appears to want to eat").

In Sanskrit, the infix , sometimes , is added to the reduplicated root, e.g.  "he wants to live" instead of  "he lives". The desiderative in Sanskrit may also be used as imminent:  "he is about to die". The Sanskrit desiderative continues Proto-Indo-European .

Dubitative 

The dubitative mood is used in Ojibwe, Turkish, Bulgarian and other languages.  It expresses the speaker's doubt or uncertainty about the event denoted by the verb. For example, in Ojibwe,  translates as "he is in Baawitigong today." When the dubitative suffix  is added, this becomes , "I guess he must be in Baawitigong."

Presumptive 
The presumptive mood is used in Romanian and Hindi to express presupposition or hypothesis, regardless of the fact denoted by the verb, as well as other more or less similar attitudes: doubt, curiosity, concern, condition, indifference, inevitability. Often, for a sentence in presumptive mood, no exact translation can be constructed in English which conveys the same nuance.

The Romanian sentence,   "he must have gone there" shows the basic presupposition use, while the following excerpt from a poem by Eminescu shows the use both in a conditional clause  "suppose it is" and in a main clause showing an attitude of submission to fate  "we would bear". 

In Hindi, the presumptive mood can be used in all the three tenses. The same structure for a particular grammatical aspect can be used to refer to the present, past and future times depending on the context. The table below shows the conjugations for the presumptive mood copula in Hindi and Romanian with some exemplar usage on the rightː

Hortative 

The hortative or hortatory mood is used to express plea, insistence, imploring, self-encouragement, wish, desire, intent, command, purpose or consequence. It does not exist in English, but phrases such as "let us" are often used to denote it. In Latin, it is interchangeable with the jussive.

Inferential 

The inferential mood (abbreviated  or ) is used to report a nonwitnessed event without confirming it, but the same forms also function as admiratives in the Balkan languages in which they occur. The inferential mood is used in some languages such as Turkish to convey information about events that were not directly observed or were inferred by the speaker. When referring to Bulgarian and other Balkan languages, it is often called renarrative mood; when referring to Estonian, it is called oblique mood. The inferential is usually impossible to distinguish when translated into English. For instance, indicative Bulgarian  and Turkish  translates the same as inferential  and  — with the English indicative he went. Using the first pair, however, implies very strongly that the speaker either witnessed the event or is very sure that it took place. The second pair implies either that the speaker did not in fact witness it taking place, that it occurred in the remote past, or that there is considerable doubt as to whether it actually happened. If it were necessary to make the distinction, then the English constructions "he must have gone" or "he is said to have gone" would partly translate the inferential.

References

External links 
 Greek moods
 Mood and modality: Out of theory and into the fray

Grammatical moods